William Anthony Steels (January 8, 1959 – March 3, 2017) was an American football running back in the National Football League who played for the Buffalo Bills and San Diego Chargers. He played college football for the Nebraska Cornhuskers. He also played in the USFL for the Boston/New Orleans Breakers. 

He died on March 3, 2017.

References

1959 births
2017 deaths
American football running backs
American football return specialists
Buffalo Bills players
San Diego Chargers players
Nebraska Cornhuskers football players